Angel's tears is a common name for several plants and may refer to:

Brugmansia suaveolens, a semi-woody shrub in the family Solanaceae native to South America, with showy white or pink flowers
Narcissus triandrus, an herbaceous plant in the family Amaryllidaceae native to Europe, with showy cream or yellow flowers
Soleirolia soleirolii, an herbaceous plant in the family Urticaceae native to southern Europe